Boruta may refer to:

Boruta (mythology), a folkloric character
Boruta, Opole Voivodeship, a village in Poland
Boruta (surname)
Devil Boruta, a folkloric character
Boruta, 8th-century Carantanian chieftain; see Boruth

See also
Borut (disambiguation)
Boruto (disambiguation)